The Women's team pursuit competition at the 2018 UCI Track Cycling World Championships was held on 28 February and 1 March 2018.

Results

Qualifying
The eight fastest teams advanced to the first round.

First round
First round heats were held as follows:
Heat 1: 6th v 7th fastest
Heat 2: 5th v 8th fastest
Heat 3: 2nd v 3rd fastest
Heat 4: 1st v 4th fastest

The winners of heats three and four proceeded to the gold medal race. The remaining six teams were ranked on time, from which the top two proceeded to the bronze medal race.

 QG = qualified for gold medal final
 QB = qualified for bronze medal final

Finals
The final classification was determined in the medal finals.

References

Women's team pursuit
UCI Track Cycling World Championships – Women's team pursuit